Master Film is a Polish dubbing studio based in Warsaw, the capital of Poland. The studio was founded in 1992. The studio commissions dubbed and subtitled versions of content for its clients. Master Film is also one of two dubbing studios that Nickelodeon works with to produce Polish versions of material shown on it, the other being Start International Polska. The studio also works with TVN to produce versions of material shown on it and also animated shown on TVN 7's children block, Bajkowe kino.

Clients
 Warner Bros.
 Disney Character Voices International
 Teletoon+
 MiniMini+
 Telewizja Polska
 BBC Prime
 Canal+ Poland
 Cartoon Network (Poland)
 Disney Channel (Poland)
 Nickelodeon (Poland)
 Fox Kids (Poland)
 KidsCo

Content
 Ben 10
 Ben 10: Alien Force
 Ben 10: Ultimate Alien
 Ben 10: Secret of the Omnitrix
 Ben 10: Race Against Time
 Ben 10: Alien Swarm
 Pokémon 3: The Movie
 Pokémon: Mewtwo Returns
 SpongeBob SquarePants
 My Life as a Teenage Robot
 The Man Called Flintstone
 The Flintstone Comedy Show (1980)
 Scooby Goes Hollywood
 The New Scooby and Scrappy-Doo Show
 A Pup Named Scooby-Doo
 What's New, Scooby-Doo?
 Shaggy & Scooby-Doo Get a Clue!
 Scooby-Doo, Where Are You!
 Scooby-Doo! Mystery Incorporated
 Scooby-Doo Meets the Boo Brothers
 Scooby-Doo and the Ghoul School
 Scooby-Doo and the Reluctant Werewolf
 Scooby-Doo! in Arabian Nights
 Scooby-Doo on Zombie Island
 Scooby-Doo! and the Witch's Ghost
 Scooby-Doo and the Alien Invaders
 Scooby-Doo and the Cyber Chase
 Scooby-Doo! and the Legend of the Vampire
 Scooby-Doo! and the Monster of Mexico
 Scooby-Doo! and the Loch Ness Monster
 Aloha, Scooby-Doo!
 Scooby-Doo! in Where's My Mummy?
 Scooby-Doo! Pirates Ahoy!
 Scooby-Doo! and the Goblin King
 As Told by Ginger
 Dexter's Laboratory
 Three Delivery
 T.U.F.F. Puppy
 Pinky and the Brain (Seasons 1 and 2)
 Tiny Toon Adventures
 Back at the Barnyard
 Batman: The Animated Series
 The Batman
 Batman & Robin
 Animaniacs
 Justice League
 Justice League Unlimited
 Batman Beyond
 Batman: The Brave and the Bold
 Blue's Clues
 Re-Animated
 Out of Jimmy's Head
 Hi Hi Puffy AmiYumi
 The Powerpuff Girls
 The Powerpuff Girls Movie
 Looney Tunes
 American Dragon: Jake Long (Season 1)
 Robotboy
 The Mighty B!
 The Sylvester & Tweety Mysteries
 Baby Looney Tunes
 Duck Dodgers
 Looney Tunes: Back in Action
 Taz-Mania
 Ozzy & Drix
 League of Super Evil
 Hot Wheels Battle Force 5
 Captain Biceps
 Gormiti
 The Life and Times of Juniper Lee
 Lola & Virginia
 100 Deeds for Eddie McDowd
 The Amazing Spiez!
 Class of the Titans
 Freakazoid!
 Animalia
 Cyberchase
 Danny Phantom
 Doug
 Jim Button and Luke the Engine Driver
 The Why Why Family
 Adventures of the Little Mermaid
 CatDog
 The Adventures of Hutch the Honeybee (1989 series)
 Fanboy & Chum Chum
 Tom and Jerry
 Tom & Jerry Kids
 Tom and Jerry: The Movie (1999 dub)
 Tom and Jerry: The Fast and the Furry
 Heathcliff and The Catillac Cats (Second dub)
 Rainbow Brite
 Dragon Ball Z: Fusion Reborn
 Dragon Ball Z: Wrath of the Dragon
 Rocket Power
 The Little Mermaid (TV series) (Second dub)
 Chowder
 Clifford's Really Big Movie
 Josie and the Pussycats (TV series)
 TaleSpin
 Free Willy
 Stuart Little
 Stuart Little 2
 Stuart Little: The Animated Series (MiniMini edition)
 Racing Stripes
 Friends (Seasons 1–6)
 Space Jam
 Grumpy Old Men
 Grumpier Old Men
 Chip 'n Dale Rescue Rangers (Second dub)
 Captain Caveman and the Teen Angels
 The Incredibles
 Will & Grace
 Babe
 Star Trek: Voyager
 Iron Man: The Animated Series (Season 2)
 The Brave Little Toaster
 My Little Pony: Friendship Is Magic (MiniMini edition/Seasons 1–3)
 Supah Ninjas
 Team Umizoomi
 Kirikou and the Sorceress
 Postman Pat (Season 4)
 The Jungle Book (1967 film)
 The Jungle Book 2
 Country Life
 Benjamin the Elephant (First dub)
 Once Upon a Time... Life
 Once Upon a Time... The Discoverers
 Wild Instinct
 Dive Olly Dive!
 Radio Free Roscoe
 Mokku of the Oak Tree (Second dub)
 G.I. Joe: Renegades
 Chicken Town
 The Troop
 Sushi Pack
 GoGoRiki (Nickelodeon edition)
 Clifford's Puppy Days
 Fun with Claude
 The Mask
 Corduroy
 The Haunted Mansion
 Asterix in Britain
 Rescue Heroes
 Herbie: Fully Loaded
 Valiant (2005 film)
 The Avengers: Earth's Mightiest Heroes
 The Hunchback of Notre Dame (1996 film)
 The Buzz on Maggie
 The Princess Diaries 2: Royal Engagement
 Bonkers (TV series)
 Little Mouse on the Prairie

Voice artists
 Agata Gawrońska-Bauman
 Monika Pikuła
 Janusz Wituch
 Dorota Segda
 Grzegorz Drojewski
 Piotr Fronczewski
 Hanna Kinder-Kiss
 Beata Jankowska-Tzimas
 Krzysztof Banaszyk
 Sebastian Konrad
 Anna Bielańska
 Agnieszka Kunikowska
 Joanna Pach
 Krystyna Kozanecka
 Monika Kwiatkowska-Dejczer
 Iwona Rulewicz
 Zbigniew Kozłowski
 Marek Włodarczyk
 Mirosław Wieprzewski
 Jarosław Boberek
 Elżbieta Jędrzejewska
 Maria Sapierzanka
 Kajetan Lewandowski
 Cezary Morawski
 Włodzimierz Press
 Robert Czebotar
 Tomasz Bednarek
 Janusz Zakrzeński
 Jarosław Budnik
 Jacek Rozenek
 Lucyna Malec
 Ewa Kania
 Dorota Landowska
 Joanna Wizmur
 Małgorzata Drozd
 Magdalena Krylik-Gruziel
 Anna Apostolakis
 Brygida Turowska
 Jacek Bończyk
 Marek Bargiełowski
 Marcin Troński
 Jan Janga-Tomaszewski
 Henryk Machalica
 Maciej Robakiewicz
 Teresa Lipowska
 Jacek Braciak
 Jacek Czyż
 Józef Mika
 Wojciech Szymański
 January Brunov
 Ewa Smolińska
 Joanna Koroniewska
 Dominika Kluźniak
 Anna Sroka
 Kacper Kuszewski
 Leopold Matuszczak
 Modest Ruciński
 Mateusz Narloch
 Łukasz Lewandowski
 Jacek Król
 Leszek Zduń
 Łukasz Talik
 Piotr Deszkiewicz
 Przemysław Wyszyński
 Agnieszka Fajlhauer
 Agnieszka Mrozińska
 Ilona Kuśmierska
 Małgorzata Szymańska
 Beata Wyrąbkiewicz
 Beata Łuczak
 Elżbieta Gaertner
 Zuzanna Galia
 Jerzy Zelnik
 Klaudiusz Kaufmann
 Jan Prochyra
 Marek Molak
 Mariusz Benoit
 Mariusz Leszczyński
 Sebastian Machalski
 Mikołaj Klimek
 Zbigniew Zamachowski
 Joanna Budniok-Feliks
 Karina Kunkiewicz
 Beatrycze Łukaszewska
 Kinga Tabor-Szymaniak
 Jerzy Bończak
 Miłogost Reczek
 Robert Tondera
 Krzysztof Kumor
 Aleksander Mikołajczak
 Danuta Szaflarska
 Andrzej Chudy
 Aleksander Gawroński
 Stanisław Brudny
 Wojciech Wysocki
 Andrzej Ferenc
 Michał Podsiadło
 Radosław Pazura
 Izabela Dąbrowska
 Anna Gajewska
 Artur Pontek
 Marcin Hycnar
 Krzysztof Szczerbiński
 Sebastian Cybulski
 Jacek Kopczyński
 Dariusz Odija
 Zbigniew Konopka
 Gabriela Kownacka
 Krystyna Tkacz
 Jacek Kawalec
 Karolina Gruszka
 Karol Wróblewski
 Maciej Musiał
 Joanna Domańska
 Wit Apostolakis-Gluziński
 Katarzyna Łaska
 Katarzyna Skrzynecka
 Adam Bauman
 Dariusz Błażejewski
 Jakub Szydłowski

See also
Studio Sonica
Start International Polska

References

External links
 

Film production companies of Poland
Mass media companies established in 1992
Companies based in Warsaw
Polish companies established in 1992
Mass media in Warsaw
Polish dubbing studios